Shahrak-e Farhangian (also Romanized as Shahrak-e Farhangīān) is a village in Esfivard-e Shurab Rural District, in the Central District of Sari County, Mazandaran Province, Iran. At the 2006 census, its population was 1,103, in 278 families.

References 

Populated places in Sari County